Barbara Sadleder (born 17 June 1967 in Steyr) is a retired Austrian alpine skier who competed in the 1992 Winter Olympics.

External links
 sports-reference.com

1967 births
Living people
Austrian female alpine skiers
Olympic alpine skiers of Austria
Alpine skiers at the 1992 Winter Olympics
People from Steyr
Sportspeople from Upper Austria